The 2018 Dwars door Vlaanderen was a road cycling one-day race that took place on 28 March 2018 in Belgium. It was the 73rd edition of Dwars door Vlaanderen and the twelfth event of the 2018 UCI World Tour. It was won for the second year in a row by Yves Lampaert – becoming the first rider to win the race in consecutive years. He finished two seconds ahead of 's Mike Teunissen and Sep Vanmarcke, riding for the  team, completed the podium.

Teams
As the race was only added to the UCI World Tour calendar in 2017, all UCI WorldTeams were invited to the race, but not obligated to compete in the race. As such, seventeen of the eighteen WorldTeams – with the exception of  – competed in the race, up one on 2017. Eight UCI Professional Continental teams competed, completing the 25-team peloton.

Route
There were 12 categorised climbs:

Result

References

External links

2018 UCI World Tour
2018 in Belgian sport
2018
March 2018 sports events in Belgium